Wendy Jensen (born 22 January 1964 in Auckland, New Zealand) is a lawn bowls competitor for New Zealand.

Bowls career

World Championship
Jensen won a bronze medal at the 2004 World Outdoor Bowls Championship in Leamington Spa.

Commonwealth Games
Jensen won a bronze medal in the women's fours at the 2002 Commonwealth Games.

Asia Pacific
Jensen has won two gold medals at the Asia Pacific Bowls Championships, the latest at the 2019 Asia Pacific Bowls Championships in the Gold Coast, Queensland.

References

Living people
1964 births
New Zealand female bowls players
Commonwealth Games bronze medallists for New Zealand
Bowls players at the 2002 Commonwealth Games
Commonwealth Games medallists in lawn bowls
20th-century New Zealand women
21st-century New Zealand women
Medallists at the 2002 Commonwealth Games